The 1958–59 Serie A season was the 29th edition of Serie A, the top-level football competition in Italy. The championship was won by Milan.

Teams
Triestina and Bari had been promoted from Serie B.

Final classification

Juventus was the cupwinner.

Results

Top goalscorers

Source

References

Almanacco Illustrato del Calcio - La Storia 1898-2004, Panini Edizioni, Modena, September 2005

External links
  - All results on RSSSF Website.

Serie A seasons
Italy
1958–59 in Italian football leagues